Delphrine L. Lee (born January 19, 1976) is a former American football defensive back who played for the New York Jets of the National Football League (NFL) for four games in the 1999 season. He played college football at McNeese State University.

References 

Living people
1976 births
Players of American football from New Orleans
American football defensive backs
McNeese Cowboys football players
New York Jets players